A Gamble with Death is a 1913 American drama film featuring Harry Carey.

Cast
 Walter Miller as Reed
 Claire McDowell as Kate
 Charles West as The Gambler (as Charles H. West)
 Lionel Barrymore as Jim Benton, the Bartender
 Harry Carey as  The Cowpuncher

See also
 Harry Carey filmography
 Lionel Barrymore filmography

External links

1913 films
Silent American drama films
1913 short films
American silent short films
American black-and-white films
1913 drama films
Films directed by Anthony O'Sullivan
1910s American films